No Doubt About It is the third studio album by American country music artist Neal McCoy. Released in 1994, it is considered his breakthrough album, and has been certified platinum in the United States. Both the album's title track and "Wink" reached the top of the Billboard Hot Country Singles & Tracks (now Hot Country Songs) charts, the latter holding its peak position for four weeks. The album's third single, "The City Put the Country Back in Me", was also a Top 5 hit.

Critical reception
In New Country magazine, Brian Mansfield referred to the lyrics of other songs as "rang[ing] from the simple-minded to the genuinely embarrassing" and gave the album two stars out of five. He was more positive in his review for Allmusic, giving it four-and-a-half stars and saying that it "was the first to capture the rock-influenced sound of McCoy's stage show."

Alanna Nash of Entertainment Weekly gave the album a C− rating, criticizing the title track in particular: "If radio thinks this blander-than-generic ballad is the future of country, we might as well just move to the middle of the road right now."

Track listing

Personnel
Eddie Bayers – drums, percussion
Barry Beckett – keyboards
Gary Burr – background vocals
Paul Franklin – steel guitar
Neal McCoy – lead vocals 
Phil Naish – keyboards
Donny Parenteau – fiddle, mandolin
Don Potter – acoustic guitar
Michael Rhodes – bass guitar
Brent Rowan – electric guitar
Harry Stinson – background vocals
Dennis Wilson – background vocals

Charts

Weekly charts

Year-end charts

Singles

References

1994 albums
Atlantic Records albums
Neal McCoy albums
Albums produced by Barry Beckett